Jillian Marie Barberie (née Warry; born September 26, 1966) is a Canadian-born American television hostess, sportscaster, radio personality and actress. From 1995 to 2012, she was a co-host on the Los Angeles television morning news and entertainment program Good Day L.A. on Fox owned-and-operated station KTTV. From 2000 to 2005, she appeared on Fox Sports as the weather host for Fox NFL Sunday. From 2006 to 2013, she was known as Jillian Reynolds, from her second marriage.

Early life
Barberie was born Jillian Warry in Burlington, Ontario, and was adopted soon after her birth. Later in life after finding her biological parents, she learned they had later married and raised two daughters. Barberie suffered sexual abuse as a child. She graduated from Mohawk College in Hamilton, Ontario, with a diploma from its two-year program in broadcast journalism. After completing her diploma, she worked for several other television stations, including The Weather Network in Montreal, Quebec, WSVN in Miami, Florida, and KTTV in Los Angeles, California.

Career
Barberie has been featured on several television series including Clueless, V.I.P., and Melrose Place, as well as several comedies in the CBS comedy series Yes, Dear and the Fox sketch comedy series MADtv. She hosted the syndicated reality series EX-treme Dating. In 2000, she was hired to present the national weather segment of Fox Sports Fox NFL Sunday pre-game show, working alongside James Brown, Howie Long, and Terry Bradshaw. She became a national figure and earned significant fan interest in the male-dominated sports demographic, and several spots for Prestone antifreeze that aired during NFL game broadcasts.

In addition to Barberie's work on Good Day L.A., she worked on the national version of the show Good Day Live. However, she was ultimately fired from that show, ending her tenure on June 4, 2004.

She served as a weather and entertainment reporter for Fox Sports during the 2002 Super Bowl, the 2005 Super Bowl, and the 2008 Super Bowl. In 2005, she was Regis Philbin's co-host for his New Year's Eve special on Fox. She has appeared on the cover of Maxim magazine twice. In 2006, she participated as a contestant on the Fox reality television series Skating with Celebrities, partnered with professional skater John Zimmerman and came in second place. She was an ice skater in her childhood. Beginning in November 2006, she became the co-host of KTTV's That's So Hollywood with fellow KTTV/KCOP-TV personality, Mark Thompson.

Barberie is a former NutriSystem spokesperson appearing in commercials alongside former NFL players Dan Marino and Terry Bradshaw.

In March 2009, Barberie was also the host of American Idol Extra on Fox Reality Channel. She interviewed the eliminated participant each week and other guests who appear on the show. She has appeared alongside her then-husband, Grant Reynolds, in the Fox Reality Channel original series, Househusbands of Hollywood.

Beginning in February 2014, she co-hosted Midday Live with John Phillips on 790 KABC in Los Angeles. In December 2019 KABC moved Phillips back to middays but did not renew Barberie's contract. She has also hosted the short-lived entertainment program Hollywood Mix on KTLA.

Personal life
Barberie was married to former Major League Baseball player Bret Barberie from 1996 to 2002. In 2003, Barberie announced that she is bisexual.

She married former Marine sniper turned actor Grant Reynolds in a private ceremony on July 8, 2006. She initially stated that she was legally changing her name to Jillian Reynolds, but keeping Barberie as her professional surname.

In December 2006, People magazine said Reynolds was pregnant with her first child, due July 7. She officially announced her pregnancy the morning of December 18, 2006, during the broadcast of Good Day L.A. Barberie took three-month maternity leave from the show beginning June 22, 2007. On July 9, an announcement on Good Day L.A. stated that she had given birth to a girl, Ruby Raven Reynolds, on July 6, 2007. On July 6, 2009, she announced on Good Day LA that she was pregnant with her second child. She gave birth to a boy, Rocco Rio Reynolds, on January 11, 2010.

In 2011, Barberie became a naturalized citizen of the United States.

On March 15, 2013, Barberie announced that she and her husband Grant Reynolds were divorcing. The divorce was finalized on February 14, 2014.

In November 2018, Barberie announced that she has breast cancer that had spread to her lymph node. She received a double mastectomy within two weeks of the diagnosis.

References

External links
 
 Jillian's Appearance on The Eric Andre Show on YouTube 

1966 births
Actresses from Los Angeles
Actresses from Ontario
American women television journalists
Canadian adoptees
Canadian expatriate actresses in the United States
Canadian film actresses
Canadian infotainers
Canadian people of Irish descent
Canadian people of Lithuanian descent
Canadian television actresses
Canadian women television journalists
Figure skating commentators
Figure skating reality television participants
Living people
National Football League announcers
Naturalized citizens of the United States
Pelmorex people
People from Burlington, Ontario
Radio personalities from Los Angeles
Television anchors from Los Angeles
Television anchors from Miami
Women sports announcers
21st-century American women